Rumonge Province is one of the eighteen provinces of Burundi. It was created on 26 March 2015 by combining the communes of Burambi, Buyengero and Rumonge, previously part of Bururi Province, with the Bugarama and Muhuta communes previously belonging to Bujumbura Rural Province.

Geography
The capital is at Rumonge, on the shores of Lake Tanganyika. The Rumonge Nature Reserve, a semi-deciduous forest, and Kigwena Nature Reserve, a lowland tropical forest, are located in the province.

Government
The province's first governor, Juvénal Bigirimana, was sworn in on 17 April 2015. In June 2015 it elected four deputies to Burundi's National Assembly, and in July it chose its first two senators, Jean-Pierre Ndayahundwa and Tharcisse Rutomo.

Communes
Rumonge Province administers the following communes:
 Commune of Bugarama
 Commune of Burambi
 Commune of Buyengero
 Commune of Muhuta
 Commune of Rumonge

References

 
Provinces of Burundi